Events during the year 2012 in Northern Ireland.

Incumbents
 First Minister - Peter Robinson 
 deputy First Minister - Martin McGuiness 
 Secretary of State - Owen Paterson (until 4 September), Theresa Villiers (from 4 September)

Events

March

 17 March – Saint Patrick's Day parade and carnival in Belfast city centre and Custom House Square.
 31 March – Former broadcast journalist Mike Nesbitt elected leader of the Ulster Unionist Party.

April

 15 April – RMS Titanic maiden voyage centenary celebrations, including opening of £90m Titanic Belfast visitor facility.

May

 3 May – Bairbre de Brún submitted her resignation to the European Parliament as MEP for Northern Ireland.
 22 May – Murder of Michaela McAreavey trial began in Mauritius.

June

 Lord Mayor's Parade in Belfast.
 Queen Elizabeth's Diamond Jubilee celebrations throughout Northern Ireland.
 26 June – The Queen began a two-day visit to Northern Ireland in Enniskillen.
 27 June – The Queen met former IRA commander Martin McGuinness for the first time, in Belfast. They met and shook hands in private in the McGrath Suite of the Lyric Theatre. The meeting was witnessed by the Duke of Edinburgh, the Northern Ireland first minister, Peter Robinson, the President of Ireland, Michael D. Higgins, and his wife, Sabina. The Queen and McGuinness shook hands once more in public for the benefit of the media. It was also the first meeting between the Queen and the recently elected president Higgins.

July

 3 July – Giant's Causeway Visitors' Centre designed by Heneghan Peng for the National Trust was opened.
 12 July – Marching season culminated in The Twelfth celebration of the Glorious Revolution and the Battle of the Boyne.

August

 16 August – Thirty antique accordions were stolen in County Down.

September

 13 September – Fermanagh player Brian Óg Maguire died in an industrial accident in the Ballymaconnell Road area of Derrylin.
 15 September – Ulster player Nevin Spence died in County Down. His father and brother also died.

October

 4 October – Expelled Ulster Unionist Party member David McNarry, representing Strangford, joined the UK Independence Party, giving it its first representative in any of the devolved assemblies in Britain and Northern Ireland.
 18 October – Marie Stopes International opened a clinic in Belfast.
 23 October – Derry was named fourth in a top ten of cities to visit in 2013 by the travel guidebook Lonely Planet.
 24 October – Digital television transition in the UK is completed in Northern Ireland.

November

 3 November – Match for Michaela at Casement Park.

December

 3 December – Trouble flared in Belfast as hundreds of hooded Loyalists burn Irish tricolours and tried to storm Belfast City Hall.

The arts

 20 April – Belfast MAC (Metropolitan Arts Centre), designed by Hackett Hall McKnight, opened.
 June – European Pipe Band Championships in Stormont.
 Glenn Patterson's novel The Mill for Grinding Old People Young was published.

Sports

January

 16 January – Occupy Belfast: The Bank of Ireland was occupied in the city.
 28 January – Irish Football League Cup final – Coleraine v Crusaders.

February

 Irish Indoor Athletics Championships in the Odyssey Arena.

March

 17 March – Loughgiel Shamrocks (Antrim) won the All-Ireland Senior Club Hurling Championship, defeating Coolderry GAA (Offaly) 4–13 to 0–07 in the final.
 31 March – Crossmaglen Rangers (Armagh) won the All-Ireland Senior Club Football Championship, defeating Garrycastle (Westmeath) 2–19 to 1–07 in the replay after the final initially ended in a 0–15 to 1–12 draw on 17 March.

May
 15 May – The most supported football team in Northern Ireland, Manchester United played a testimonial match for their former goalkeeper, Harry Gregg against an Irish Premiership Select XI in front of over 14,000 Northern Irish Manchester United fans at Windsor Park in Belfast.

 19 May – Ulster Rugby contested the 2012 Heineken Cup Final, losing 42–14 to Leinster Rugby.
 Belfast City Marathon.

June

 3 June – The Olympic Flame arrived in Belfast, with relay runners carrying it to towns, villages, and beauty spots throughout Northern Ireland.

July

 22 July – Donegal defeated Down 2–18 to 0–13 to win a second consecutive Ulster Senior Football Championship.

August

 British Transplant Games in Belfast.

Deaths
 20 January - Lucy Faulkner, journalist, 86
 22 February - Frank Carson, comedian and actor, 85
 16 April - Ray Davey, minister, founded the Corrymeela Community, 97

See also
2012 in England
2012 in Scotland
2012 in Wales

References